Geranium niveum is a plant species in the genus Geranium.

It is a medicinal herb widely used by the Tarahumara Indians of Mexico.

Geranin A (epi-afzelechin-(4β→8, 2β→O→7)-afzelechin), geranin B (epi-catechin-(4β→8, 2β→O→7)-afzelechin), mahuannin B, reynoutrin, hyperin, methyl gallate and 3-beta-caffeoyl-12-oleanen-28-oic acid can be found in G. niveum.

References

External links 
 Geraniumm niveum at CollectionSearchCenter

niveum
Flora of Mexico
Plants described in 1886